The River Angas, part of the River Murray catchment, is a river that is located in the Adelaide Hills region in the Australian state of South Australia.

Course and features

The River Angas arises on the eastern side of the Mount Lofty Ranges. Its headwaters are near Macclesfield and it flows generally southward through Strathalbyn, emptying into Lake Alexandrina near the town of Milang. The river descends  over its  course.

Towns along the river include Macclesfield, Strathalbyn and Belvidere.

Etymology
The river was named on 31 December 1837, during the exploration by Robert Cock, William Finlayson, A. Wyatt and G. Barton from Adelaide to Lake Alexandrina. "We gave to this river the name of Angas, in honour of the chairman of the South Australian Company, whose interest in and exertions on behalf of the colony are well known."

See also

References 

Angas
Angas